

Politics
 Tanya Chan (born 1971 in Hong Kong), politician
 Audrey Eu (born 1953 in Hong Kong), politician
 Tung Chee-hwa, Chief Secretary for Administration 
 Anson Chan, Hong Kong Chief Secretary, her father Fang Shin-hau was a banker and textile businessman who moved his family to the British colony of Hong Kong in 1948
 Yang Ti-liang, former Chief Justice
 Rita Fan, politician, daughter of Hsu Ta Tung
 Carrie Lam (born 1957 in Hong Kong), HKSAR Chief Executive, ancestry in Zhoushan
 Richard Lai, (1946 in Shanghai – 2008),  politician, former member of the Legislative Council of Hong Kong, born to a family doing jewellery and property business before he moved to Hong Kong in 1950 
 Denny Huang (born in Shanghai, 1920), politician
 Ann Tse-kai (born in Shanghai 1912 - 2000)  a Hong Kong industrialist, legislator and sinologist.
 Cheng Kai-nam

Literature
 Claire Chao (born 1962 in Hong Kong), author
 Liu Yichang ( 1918 in Shanghai –2018), or Lau Yee Cheung in Cantonese,  writer, editor and publisher. He is considered the founder of Hong Kong's modern literature, ancestry in Zhenhai, Ningbo
Ni Kuang (born in Ningbo), novelist 
Jin Yong (Louis Cha Leung-yung, born in Haining, Zhejiang), novelist
Yi Shu (Isabel Nee Yeh-Su, born in Shanghai), novelist, sister of Ni Kuang

Entertainment
 Edison Chen (born 1980 in Canada), actor and singer
 Kelly Chen (born 1973 in Hong Kong), actor and singer
 Joyce Cheng (born 1987 in Canada), actor, the daughter of Lydia Shum
 Jacky Cheung (born 1961 in Hong Kong), singer, one of the "Four Heavenly Kings" of Cantopop"
 Maggie Cheung (born 1964 in Hong Kong)
 Deacon Chiu (born 1924 in Shanghai – 2015)
 Niki Chow (born 1979 in Hong Kong), actress
 David Chu (born 1944 in Hong Kong) 
 Judy Dan (born 1930 in Shanghai), actress
 Betty Loh Ti, born as Hsi Chung-i on 24 July 1937 into a prominent family from Pudong, the owner of the Xi Fu Ji Factory in Shanghai.
 Jan Lamb, (born 1967) DJ, singer, and actor his father was a Shanghainese suit maker.  brother of Jerry Lamb
 Li Ching (actress) (1948 in Shanghai – 2018)  as Li Guoying,
 Kelly Lai Chen ( born Hsi Chungchien in Shanghai 1933 – 2018) was actor who appeared in more than 40 films in the 1950s and 1960s, and was best known for his portrayals of sensitive young men
 Teresa Carpio, Filipino father and Shanghainese mother
 Jackson Wang (born 1994 in Hong Kong), singer and rapper based in South Korea
 Tracy Ip (born 1981 in Hong Kong), actor and beauty pageant contestant 
 Lydia Shum (born 1945 in Shanghai – 2008), actress and comedian ancestry in Ningbo

Business
 Hsu Ta Tung, business magnate, father of Rita Fan
Morris Chang (born 1931 in Ningbo), founder of Taiwan Semiconductor Manufacturing Company (TSMC), lived in Hong Kong intermittently during his childhood
 Vincent Fang, (born 943 in Shanghai), the leader of the Liberal Party of Hong Kong. He is a Hong Kong entrepreneur in the garment industry
 Z.Y. Fu (1919 in Shanghai - 2011), Chinese-American businessman
 Tao Ho  (1936 in Shanghai – 2019) architect, he was the designer of the Bauhinia emblem, ancestry in Guangdong
 Norman Hsu, (1951 in Hong Kong – 2019) American businessman who is a convicted pyramid investment promoter 
 Kung Yan-sum, (born 1943 in Shanghai), is the younger brother of Nina Wang Kung Yu-sum, the former Asia's richest woman and the late chairman of Chinachem Group, one of the biggest privately held property developer in Hong Kong.
Nina Wang, born Kung Yu Sum 1936 – 2007) was Asia's richest woman, with an estimated net worth of US$4.2 billion at the time of her death. 
Teddy Wang, (born 1933 Shanghai -?) Chinese businessman and founder of the Chinachem Group who was kidnapped for ransom in 1990, and later declared legally dead. Ancestry in to Wenzhou.
 Henry Fan (born 1948 in Shanghai), executive at Cathay Pacific, Ningbo ancestry
 David Shou-Yeh Wong (born c. 1941 Ningbo), billionaire banker and philanthropist, founder Dah Sing Bank Limited.
 Kwok family of the Wing On Group
 Yue-Kong Pao (born 1918 in Ningbo – 1991), shipping magnate 
Frank Tsao (born 1925 in Shanghai), shipping magnate (International Maritime Carriers [IMC Group]) and financier who later settled in Singapore. Tsao lived in Hong Kong for a few years after leaving mainland
Tang Ping Yuan (born 1898 in Wuxi – 1971) a Hong Kong textile entrepreneur and politician.
Y.L. Yang (Yang Yuanlong born in Shanghai), eminent textile industry figure, Wu County descent
Peter Woo Kwong-ching (born in Shanghai), 	Former chairman of Wheelock and Company Limited and The Wharf Holdings Limited, Ningbo descent
Douglas Woo, son of Peter Woo
Chao Kuang Piu, Shanghai-born textile and later airline magnate, ancestry in Yin County, Ningbo
Silas Chou, fashion businessman, early investor in Michael Kors
Susana Chou, is a Macau politician who served as the President of the Legislative Assembly of Macau
Veronica Chou

Other
 Joseph Zen (born in Shanghai)
 Francis Hsu (1920, Shanghai – 1973), first Chinese bishop of the Roman Catholic Dioceses of Hong Kong
 Andrew Gih (1901 in Shanghai–February 13, 1985) was a Chinese Protestant evangelist who cofounded the Bethel Worldwide Evangelistic Band in 1931 and founded the Evangelize China Fellowship in 1947,
 Du Yuesheng (born 1888 in Shanghai – 1951), triad leader
 Victor Dzau (born 1945 in Shanghai), scientist
 Charles K. Kao (1933 in Shanghai – 2018) Nobel Laureate electrical engineer and physicist who pioneered the development and use of fibre optics in telecommunications, ancestry in Jinshan
 Michele Reis (born 1970 in Hong Kong), Eurasian of Shanghainese descent through her mother.

References

Lists of people by ethnicity